Ben Turner (born 23 January 1984 in Brisbane) is an Australian weightlifter best known for his performances at the 2006 Commonwealth Games in Melbourne, where he won the gold medal in the 69 kg category, and the 2010 Commonwealth Games in New Delhi, India, where he won Silver in the 77 kg category.  Turner is also a coach and has worked with former top Australian female lifter Erika Yamasaki.

Early life
Turner grew up in Carina, an eastern suburb in Brisbane, the state capital of Queensland.  He attended St. Oliver Plunkett's Catholic Primary School from 1990 to 1993.  During these years he developed an interest in Australian Rules Football, Cricket and Rugby league.  From 1994 to 2001 he attended Iona College in Wynnum.  During his time there he was involved in cricket, rugby league in Junior School (1994–1996), and rugby union (1997–2001) in high school, playing all at representative level.

Weightlifting

Turner developed an interest in Olympic Weightlifting after seeing the 1996 Olympic Games in Atlanta on television.  It wasn't until 1999 that Turner did anything about his interest due to high school commitments.  After seeing an article in a local paper, he enquired to the local club about trying the sport.  In 2000, Queensland Weightlifting came to his high school to run the national talent identification clean and jerk competition.  Turner, weighing 60 kg, lifted 85 kg and placed 3rd in the event.  Within a matter of weeks Turner had started training at the Cougars Weightlifting Club at Chandler under coach Miles Wydall, the site of the 1982 Commonwealth Games.  In 2001, at the completion of Year 12, he decided to commit to weightlifting full-time.  At that point Turner withdrew from Queensland Cricket Under 17 Squad which he was a member of, sacrificing any further representative involvement in the sport.

2006 Commonwealth Games
Turner entered the Games ranked first in the Commonwealth and knew pressure would be on with the event being held in Australia.  Ben's concentration for the event got sidetracked when his father Ron suffered a stroke and was hospitalised. However, Ron recovered relatively quickly and was released from hospital within a fortnight, obviously in a very weakened condition. 
On 18 March Turner weighed in for 69 kg Men's division just under the limit at 68.97 kg, one of the heaviest in the division. The Melbourne Convention and Exhibition Centre was sold out at the atmosphere was electric, particularly for the Australian. 
Turner came out for his first attempt at 125 kg and negotiated the weight successfully, although the nerves were showing with Turner pulling the weight fractionally in front of his body which required a small step forward to balance the weight before being given the down signal.  He asked the weight to be raised to 128 kg for his second attempt. Turner attempted to pull the weight from the floor and in the second pull the bar moved slightly in his left hand causing a rotation which tore a massive callus which resulted in Turner not being able to lock his left arm out overhead and missing the weight in front.  Turner had to quickly regroup in the warm up area as he was required to follow himself which allowed two minutes on the competition clock.  He quickly had his hand strapped by the team doctor Robert Mitchell and composed himself for his final attempt in the snatch section.  Turner confidently hustled out onto the platform to a huge cheer from the home crowd.  Turner lifted the weight with much aggression and easily locked the bar out overhead which left him in great contention for the next part of the competition.  At the completion of the snatch section, Turner was in third place behind the Malaysian and Indian competitors. Turner wasn't concerned by this as he knew he had the strongest clean and jerk of all the competitors. 
Turner asked for 158 kg as his first attempt in the clean and jerk. This was a light weight for Ben, however it was a tactical move by the Australian coaches as they knew this lift would secure the bronze medal.  Turner easily lifted the weight and secured a medal for the home nation. Another tactical call was made for Ben's second attempt. This time 161 kg was requested and success would mean the silver would be secured. Turner cleaned the weight easily and locked the weight out overhead but a sudden relaxation from Turner caused him to step forward but he still managed toehold the weight received a majority decision from the referees.  The tactics continued in the warm up room. Finally the bar was asked to be loaded to 166 kg.  Turner knew the weight was well within reach as his best in this division was his own 171 kg Australian Record.  Success with the weight would mean Turner would be elevated to first position with only one lift remaining from the Malaysian lifter. Turner ran out onto the platform. The roar was deafening. Everyone was on the edge of their seats wishing for a successful lift. Turner set himself and easily cleaned the weight to his chest. The crowd cheered and went silent again as they waited for the jerk. Turner rammed the weight up overhead with ease and locked the bar overhead. The crowd went berserk. Turner started to celebrate. He was in first place, and went to the side of the platform to watch the final lift of the event.  The Malaysia came out to the stage and the crowd was almost silent, knowing that's successful lift would mean relegating the Australia silver.  The Malaysian easily cleaned the weight to his chest. The crowd hushed as it looked certain he would lift the weight. He hoisted the weight in the air, but pushed the weight forward and the weight came tumbling back to Earth. Turner had won the Gold for Australia.  Ben's emotions completely overwhelmed him and broke down in tears.  Turner ran back onto the stage to celebrate with the 3000-strong crowd. He waved at his family and friends and finally left the stage, when he was informed there was still one lift remaining in the competition from the Fijian lifter who had no chance of a medal.

2007

Following the Commonwealth Games, Turner was completely exhausted, both mentally and physically.  He decided to take the rest of 2006 off to allow his body to recover and to allow some injuries to heal and to investigate his ongoing knee problems.
He returned to training in early 2007 with his sights set on competing at the World Championships.  Turner had one warm up competition in early 2007, followed by an appearance at the Queensland State Titles.  He lifted well and achieved a World Qualifying total.  He rested from competition and chose to focus his attention on training for the World's in November.  Turner had several hiccups in his preparations and performed under expectations.

2009–10
Turner took the rest of 2008 off after his disappointment failing to qualify for the 2008 Olympic Team.
Turner used the majority of 2009 investigating problems he was experiencing in his neck and shoulder, and to his frustration received little feedback and even less pain relief.
Turner spend the year working on rehabilitation and focusing on strengthening key areas in his shoulder to allow some for of pain relief.
In September, Turner and his coach Miles decided to drop back to 69 kg for a competition in December to qualify for a higher level of funding from the Australian Weightlifting Federation.  From the time this was decided to the competition day was 54 days.  Turner was weighing around 78 kg.  The following 54 days were not fun for Ben.  His diet was immaculate and his exercise regime was intense, which included morning and evening walks and rounds of golf on the weekend, along with normal training.  On competition day, Turner weighed in at 68.85 kg and lifted a total of 277 kg, 6 kg over the amount required.

2010 was a year that was dedicated to preparing for the Commonwealth Games which were to be held in October.  Ben's training early in the year was excellent and managed to do some personal bests in training.  The first improvements in his technical lifts since 2005, when Turner was stricken with constant injuries.  However, Turner began experiencing symptoms in his neck and shoulder again and his progress began to stall, at which time Turner knew, it was going to be a hard year in and out of the gym.

On Sunday 21 March, Turner competed in the Australian Club Championships in Melbourne in the 77 kg category.  He registered lifts of 135 kg Snatch and 170 kg Clean and Jerk, and 305 kg Total.  This result was 105.17% of the qualifying total required for selection in the Australian Commonwealth Games Team, and placed Turner in a good position for overall selection.  This was his best result in competition since 2005.

Turner competed at the Oceania Championships in Fiji, from 4–7 May He competed in the 77 kg category winning a gold medal in the Senior event.

On 26 June 2010, the Commonwealth Games Weightlifting Selection Trials were held in Brisbane.  Turner lifted in the 77 kg Category and recorded weights of 133 kg Snatch and 173 kg Clean and Jerk for a total of 306 kg.  This result secured him a place in the Commonwealth Games Team.

2010 Commonwealth Games

On 4 October 2010, Turner competed in the 2010 Commonwealth Games in India.  Turner weighed in at 76.39 kg and the entry totals suggested he had a very strong chance at a medal.  He decided to move up the 77 kg category from the 69 kg category for tactical reasons.  Four years earlier Turner competed at the lighter category and won gold in Melbourne.  However, with the strength of the field in the 2010 69 kg category, Turner decided to move up a class to give himself the best overall chance to win another medal.
Turner started the event strong in the snatch section of the competition.  He opened with a very easy 128 kg and moved the weight to 131 kg for his second attempt.  Although, the lift was successful, he received a red light from one of the main referees, after he managed to save the lift from falling forward which created some movement on the platform.  His third attempt was 133 kg and managed to lift the weight much more convincingly.  At the conclusion of the snatch section of the event, Turner was in third place trailing the leaders, Peter from Nauru and Ekpo from Nigeria who both managed to lift 148 kg.
Turner knew at the half way stage of the competition he was in a very strong position to win a medal as the clean and jerk is his stronger lift.  Turner opened with 168 kg and did the lift easily, giving him a total of 301 kg.  Turner's only other rival for a medal was CPR Kumar from India who had only one lift left in the competition.  The Indian raised the bar to 171 kg which would have given him the lead over Turner but was unsuccessful which gave Turner lock on third place and a second Commonwealth Games Medal.  Turner raised the bar to 175 kg, the most he had ever done in competition, back in 2005.  Turner comfortably lifted the weight which gave him a total of 308 kg, only 1 kg less than his best ever result in competition.  However, Turner, who had been struggling with shoulder and knee injuries prior to the games, declined to take his third attempt as he felt there was no chance he could catch the leaders and third couldn't be taken away from him, and also didn't want to risk an unnecessary injury.
Turner then sat back and watched the final two lifters finish the competition.  Peter from Nauru lifted 185 kg, and Ekpo from Nigeria asked for the same weight.  However, to the surprise of many, Ekpo missed the lift, driving the jerk forward.  However, when Ekpo came out for the same weight minutes later and failed to clean the lift, there were many interested onlookers, mainly from the Australian and Nauruan camps but also from the Indians as a miss would mean a medal for them.  Ekpo came out for his third attempt and again dumped the weight forward which meant gold went to Nauru, Turner was elevated to the silver and the Indians were defaulted with the Bronze.
Turner felt extremely fortunate to have the silver instead of the bronze but as he said in the post-competition press conference "Anything can happen in competition."

2011–present

Turner took several months off after the Commonwealth Games to recover mentally and physically.  He returned to training in January 2011.  Turner competed at the Australian Club Championships in Brisbane in March and achieved a Queensland Senior Record in the Clean and Jerk in the 85 kg Category, his first record since 2005.

In April 2011, it was announced Turner was selected in the Australian team to compete in the Arafura Games to be held in Darwin, Australia in May.
On 13 May, Turner competed in the 85 kg Class in the Arafura Games.  He lifted 123 kg and 167 kg for a 290 kg Total which earned him a silver medal.  Turner was very satisfied with the result as his preparation was severely hampered by ongoing injuries.

On 2 June, Turner underwent an arthroscopic global reconstruction on his left shoulder.  The surgery went well and was expected to return to normal training by the end of 2011.

On 30 July, Turner traveled to Sydney for the Australian Weightlifting Championships as Assistant Coach for the Queensland team.  This was his first appointment as a state coach.

Turner returned to a normal training routine in November, 2011 in preparation for the 2012 Olympic Games.  However, with the short buildup, shoulder rehabilitation and dropping body weight, he was unable to get in good condition to be in the running for selection in the Australian Olympic Team.  Turner traveled to Samoa in June 2012 with the Australian Weightlifting Team to qualify Australia a spot for the Olympic Games. He placed 2nd in the 77 kg event and Australia subsequently earned one male spot for London.

Representative career in weightlifting

2001

Oceania Junior Championships - Kiribati

2002

Mermet Cup (AUS vs. USA) - Melbourne, Australia

Oceania Championships -Suva, Fiji

World Junior Championships - Havirov, Czech Republic

World Championships - Warsaw, Poland

Oceania Junior Championships - Melbourne, Australia

2003

Commonwealth & Oceania Championships - Tonga

World Junior Championships - Hermosillo, Mexico

Mermet Cup (AUS vs. USA) - Colorado Springs, United States

World Championships - Vancouver, Canada

Oceania Junior Championships - Niue

2004

Oceania Senior & Junior Championships - Suva, Fiji

World Junior Championships - Minsk, Belarus

Mermet Cup (AUS vs. USA) - Melbourne, Australia

2005

Youth Olympic Games - Sydney, Australia

Commonwealth & Oceania Championships - Melbourne, Australia

2006

Commonwealth Games - Melbourne, Australia

2007

World Championships - Chiang Mai, Thailand

2008

Oceania Championships & Continental Olympic Qualification Event - Auckland, New Zealand

2009

Due to ongoing injuries, Turner was unavailable for international competition.

2010

Oceania Championships - Suva, Fiji

Commonwealth Games - New Delhi, India

2011

Arafura Games - Darwin, Australia

2012

Oceania Championships/London Olympic Games Qualification Event Apia, Samoa

2013

Commonwealth Championships - Penang, Malaysia

Personal bests

Australian records

External links
 International Federation of Weightlifting
 Australian Weightlifting Federation
 Queensland Weightlifting Association
 Ben Turner - Lift Up Profile
 Ben Turner 

1984 births
Weightlifters from Brisbane
Australian male weightlifters
Commonwealth Games gold medallists for Australia
Weightlifters at the 2006 Commonwealth Games
Living people
Weightlifters at the 2010 Commonwealth Games
Commonwealth Games silver medallists for Australia
Commonwealth Games medallists in weightlifting
20th-century Australian people
21st-century Australian people
Medallists at the 2006 Commonwealth Games
Medallists at the 2010 Commonwealth Games